Parliamentary elections were held in South Yemen between 16 and 18 December 1978. The first elections since independence in 1967, they saw 175 candidates (all affiliated with the Yemeni Socialist Party, the sole legal party) contest the 111 seats. Voter turnout was reported to be 91.27%.

Electoral system
The 111 Members of Parliament were elected by plurality in eighty constituencies, with voters having the same number of votes as the number of seats available in their constituency.

Results

References

1978 in South Yemen
South Yemen
Elections in Yemen
One-party elections
December 1978 events in Asia